The American National Catholic Church (ANCC) is an independent church established in 2009 as a self-governing entity.

It is not in communion with the  Roman Catholic Church, whose canon law considers it a schismatic sect.

The ANCC was founded with the mission of fully implementing its interpretation of the Second Vatican Council and is notably more liberal than the Roman Catholic Church in its acceptance of married clergy, homosexuality, same-sex marriage, the ordination of women, and use of contraception.

History

The American National Catholic Church traces its apostolic succession through Roman Catholic Bishop Carlos Duarte-Costa (1888–1961) of Brazil. Bishop Duarte-Costa was an early proponent of some of the reforms of the Second Vatican Council. As early as 1936, he called for the celebration of the liturgy in the vernacular; a greater role for the laity in the liturgy, including service as eucharistic ministers; and the election rather than appointment of bishops. He advocated for allowing clergy to marry and for general absolution at Mass and was a vocal critic during and after World War II of the Brazilian government's ties with Nazi Germany. In 1945 Duarte-Costa announced plans to form the Brazilian Catholic Apostolic Church, in which priests would be permitted to marry and hold secular jobs, private confession and praying the rosaries would be abolished, and bishops would be elected by popular vote. Consequently, he was excommunicated. 

Currently, there are American National Catholic Church parishes in Connecticut, New Jersey, Pennsylvania, Missouri, North Dakota, and Virginia, with others in the process of formation in Illinois, Florida, New Mexico, and New York. ANCC priests and deacons also minister in prisons, homeless shelters, HIV/AIDS residences, psychiatric hospitals, teaching, and media. 

The first presiding bishop of the ANCC is the Most Reverend George R. Lucey, who is a member of the Franciscan Community of Mercy (FCM).

Polity and beliefs

The ANCC rejects significant parts of the entire Roman Catholic deposit of faith; it diverges from Roman Catholics regarding the ordination of women and in the realm of sexual morality. It does, however, hold belief in the Trinity, a form of apostolic succession, the salvific act of Christ, the Economy of Salvation, Mariology, and the number of sacraments. Although regarding itself as a contemporary expression of an ancient faith, it departs in many ways from the Roman Catholic Church. While it respects the Bishop of Rome, considering him "first among equals", it does not acknowledge his primacy or infallibility. 

Since its founding in 2009, the ANCC has embraced a path of intentional growth in recognition that many other Independent Catholic jurisdictions failed because they concentrated on quantity at the expense of quality. The early stages of the Church's development focused, consequently, on establishing a strong foundation and solid infrastructure, both aimed at ensuring the Church's future. The American National Catholic Church states that it measures its growth in terms of four general aims:
 to further the work of the Gospel of Jesus Christ by proclaiming the presence of the Kingdom;
 to support missionary work;
 to be involved in the planting and strengthening of local churches; and
 to edify and strengthen believers through Christian fellowship, the liturgical celebrations of the seven sacraments, and the ministry of the Word of God.

The ANCC is congregational rather than hierarchical.

The ANCC allows qualified women and gay persons to receive holy orders. Believing that the lived experience of married life can be an invaluable gift for ministry, the ANCC also welcomes married clergy.  The ANCC recognizes same-sex marriage.

Training of clergy

All clergy receive comprehensive theological training. After providing certificates of baptism and confirmation (and in the case of persons previously ordained, ordination), applicants must submit a detailed personal narrative, provide professional and personal references, and undergo exhaustive interviews with vocation/formation staff. Applicants must attend an ANCC retreat during which they are further evaluated. Applicants previously ordained in other Christian churches must complete a pastoral internship and a diaconate assignment of one year, after which an additional two-year discernment period is imposed before full incorporation into the ANCC. Only two percent of applicants are selected to study for the priesthood or for incardination.

The Church's clergy possess numerous degrees from institutions of higher learning as well as degrees from accredited seminary programs from various universities. Candidates for ordination to the diaconate and priesthood receive a rigorous, comprehensive, academic and practical education. Criminal background checks and psychological evaluations are required of all applicants. 
In 2010 the Church founded its own seminary, St. John the Beloved Seminary, offering non-residential theological studies for those pursuing the priesthood.  there were three ANCC seminarians there.

References

External links
 
 The Call

Independent Catholic denominations
Christian organizations established in 2009